Pond Island National Wildlife Refuge is a National Wildlife Refuge in the state of Maine.  It is one of the five refuges that together make up the Maine Coastal Islands National Wildlife Refuge, along with Petit Manan, Cross Island, Franklin Island, and Seal Island. Pond Island NWR is an island in the mouth of the Kennebec River adjacent to Popham Beach.

It is one of the smallest refuges in the United States National Wildlife Refuge system. It is part of the Town of Phippsburg.

References
Maine Coastal Islands National Wildlife Refuge

National Wildlife Refuges in Maine
Islands of Sagadahoc County, Maine
Protected areas of Sagadahoc County, Maine